Acrocercops rhodospira is a moth of the family Gracillariidae. It is known from Indonesia (Java).

The larvae feed on Schleicheria species. They probably mine the leaves of their host plant.

References

rhodospira
Moths of Asia
Moths described in 1939